In mathematics, a root of unity, occasionally called a de Moivre number, is any complex number that yields 1 when raised to some positive integer power . Roots of unity are used in many branches of mathematics, and are especially important in number theory, the theory of group characters, and the discrete Fourier transform.

Roots of unity can be defined in any field. If the characteristic of the field is zero, the roots are complex numbers that are also algebraic integers. For fields with a positive characteristic, the roots belong to a finite field, and, conversely, every nonzero element of a finite field is a root of unity. Any algebraically closed field contains exactly  th roots of unity, except when  is a multiple of the (positive) characteristic of the field.

General definition

An th root of unity, where  is a positive integer, is a number  satisfying the equation

Unless otherwise specified, the roots of unity may be taken to be complex numbers (including the number 1, and the number −1 if  is even, which are complex with a zero imaginary part), and in this case, the th roots of unity are

Conversely, every nonzero element in a finite field is a root of unity in that field. See Root of unity modulo n and Finite field for further details.

An th root of unity is said to be  if it is not an th root of unity for some smaller , that is if

If n is a prime number, then all th roots of unity, except 1, are primitive.

Subsequent sections of this article will comply with complex roots of unity. For the case of roots of unity in fields of nonzero characteristic, see . For the case of roots of unity in rings of modular integers, see Root of unity modulo n.

Elementary properties

Any integer power of an th root of unity is also an th root of unity, as

This is also true for negative exponents. In particular, the reciprocal of an th root of unity is its complex conjugate, and is also an th root of unity:

If  is an th root of unity and  then . Indeed, by the definition of congruence modulo n,  for some integer , and hence

Let  be a primitive th root of unity. (If  where , then , which would imply that  would not be primitive.)

From the preceding, it follows that, if  is a primitive th root of unity, then  if and only if 
If  is not primitive then   implies  but the converse may be false, as shown by the following example.

Let  be a primitive th root of unity.

Thus 

This implies that if  is a prime number, all the roots except  are primitive.

Group properties

Group of all roots of unity
The product and the multiplicative inverse of two roots of unity are also roots of unity.

Therefore, the roots of unity form an abelian group under multiplication. This group is the torsion subgroup of the circle group.

Group of th roots of unity
For an integer n, the product and the multiplicative inverse of two th roots of unity are also th roots of unity. Therefore, the th roots of unity form an abelian group under multiplication.

This means that the group of the th roots of unity is a cyclic group. It is worth remarking that the term of cyclic group originated from the fact that this group is a subgroup of the circle group.

Galois group of the primitive th roots of unity

In this case, the map

The rules of exponentiation imply that the composition of two such automorphisms is obtained by multiplying the exponents. It follows that the map

defines a group isomorphism between the units of the ring of integers modulo  and the Galois group of 

This shows that this Galois group is abelian, and implies thus that the primitive roots of unity may be expressed in terms of radicals.

Trigonometric expression

De Moivre's formula, which is valid for all real  and integers , is

Setting  gives a primitive th root of unity – one gets

but

In other words, 

is a primitive th root of unity.

This geometric fact accounts for the term "cyclotomic" in such phrases as cyclotomic field and cyclotomic polynomial; it is from the Greek roots "cyclo" (circle) plus "tomos" (cut, divide).

Euler's formula

which is valid for all real , can be used to put the formula for the th roots of unity into the form

Algebraic expression

The th roots of unity are, by definition, the roots of the polynomial , and are thus algebraic numbers. As this polynomial is not irreducible (except for ), the primitive th roots of unity are roots of an irreducible polynomial (over the integers) of lower degree, called the th cyclotomic polynomial, and often denoted .

Galois theory can be used to show that the cyclotomic polynomials may be conveniently solved in terms of radicals. (The trivial form  is not convenient, because it contains non-primitive roots, such as 1, which are not roots of the cyclotomic polynomial, and because it does not give the real and imaginary parts separately.) This means that, for each positive integer , there exists an expression built from integers by root extractions, additions, subtractions, multiplications, and divisions (and nothing else), such that the primitive th roots of unity are exactly the set of values that can be obtained by choosing values for the root extractions ( possible values for a th root). (For more details see , below.)

Gauss proved that a primitive th root of unity can be expressed using only square roots, addition, subtraction, multiplication and division if and only if it is possible to construct with compass and straightedge the regular -gon. This is the case if and only if  is either a power of two or the product of a power of two and Fermat primes that are all different.

The polynomial  is an irreducible polynomial whose roots are all real. Its degree is a power of two, if and only if  is a product of a power of two by a product (possibly empty) of distinct Fermat primes, and the regular -gon is constructible with compass and straightedge. Otherwise, it is solvable in radicals, but one are in the casus irreducibilis, that is, every expression of the roots in terms of radicals involves nonreal radicals.

Explicit expressions in low degrees
 For , the cyclotomic polynomial is  Therefore, the only primitive first root of unity is 1, which is a non-primitive th root of unity for every n > 1.
 As , the only primitive second (square) root of unity is −1, which is also a non-primitive th root of unity for every even . With the preceding case, this completes the list of real roots of unity.
 As , the primitive third (cube) roots of unity, which are the roots of this quadratic polynomial, are 
 As , the four primitive fifth roots of unity are the roots of this quartic polynomial, which may be explicitly solved in terms of radicals, giving the roots  where  may take the two values 1 and −1 (the same value in the two occurrences).
 As , there are two primitive sixth roots of unity, which are the negatives (and also the square roots) of the two primitive cube roots: 
 As 7 is not a Fermat prime, the seventh roots of unity are the first that require cube roots. There are 6 primitive seventh roots of unity, which are pairwise complex conjugate. The sum of a root and its conjugate is twice its real part. These three sums are the three real roots of the cubic polynomial  and the primitive seventh roots of unity are  where  runs over the roots of the above polynomial. As for every cubic polynomial, these roots may be expressed in terms of square and cube roots. However, as these three roots are all real, this is casus irreducibilis, and any such expression involves non-real cube roots.
 As , the four primitive eighth roots of unity are the square roots of the primitive fourth roots, . They are thus 
 See Heptadecagon for the real part of a 17th root of unity.

Periodicity
If  is a primitive th root of unity, then the sequence of powers
 
is -periodic (because  for all values of ), and the  sequences of powers

Furthermore, the set } of these sequences is a basis of the linear space of all -periodic sequences. This means that any -periodic sequence of complex numbers
 
can be expressed as a linear combination of powers of a primitive th root of unity:

for some complex numbers  and every integer .

This is a form of Fourier analysis.

Choosing for the primitive th root of unity

This is a discrete Fourier transform.

Summation
Let  be the sum of all the th roots of unity, primitive or not. Then

This is an immediate consequence of Vieta's formulas.

Alternatively, for  there is nothing to prove, and for  there exists a root  – since the set  of all the th roots of unity is a group, so the sum satisfies , whence .

Let  be the sum of all the primitive th roots of unity. Then

where  is the Möbius function.

This implies

Applying the Möbius inversion formula gives

In this formula, if , then , and for : .  Therefore, .

This is the special case  of Ramanujan's sum , defined as the sum of the th powers of the primitive th roots of unity:

Orthogonality

The  matrix  whose th entry is

defines a discrete Fourier transform.  Computing the inverse transformation using Gaussian elimination requires  operations.  However, it follows from the orthogonality that  is unitary.  That is,

(This fact was first noted by Gauss when solving the problem of trigonometric interpolation.)

Cyclotomic polynomials

The zeros of the polynomial

are precisely the th roots of unity, each with multiplicity 1. The th cyclotomic polynomial is defined by the fact that its zeros are precisely the primitive th roots of unity, each with multiplicity 1.
 
The polynomial  has integer coefficients and is an irreducible polynomial over the rational numbers (that is, it cannot be written as the product of two positive-degree polynomials with rational coefficients). The case of prime , which is easier than the general assertion, follows by applying Eisenstein's criterion to the polynomial

and expanding via the binomial theorem.

This implies that

This formula represents the factorization of the polynomial  into irreducible factors:

Applying Möbius inversion to the formula gives

where  is the Möbius function. So the first few cyclotomic polynomials are

If  is a prime number, then all the th roots of unity except 1 are primitive th roots. Therefore,

Thus a necessary (but not sufficient) condition for a repunit to be prime is that its length be prime.

Note that, contrary to first appearances, not all coefficients of all cyclotomic polynomials are 0, 1, or −1. More precisely, it can be shown that if  has 1 or 2 odd prime factors (for example) then the th cyclotomic polynomial only has coefficients 0, 1 or −1. This by itself doesn't prove the 105th polynomial has another coefficient, but does show it is the first one which even has a chance of working (and then a computation of the coefficients shows it does). A theorem of Schur says that there are cyclotomic polynomials with coefficients arbitrarily large in absolute value. In particular, if  where  are odd primes,  and t is odd, then  occurs as a coefficient in the th cyclotomic polynomial.

Many restrictions are known about the values that cyclotomic polynomials can assume at integer values. For example, if  is prime, then  if and only .

Cyclotomic polynomials are solvable in radicals, as roots of unity are themselves radicals. Moreover, there exist more informative radical expressions for th roots of unity with the additional property that every value of the expression obtained by choosing values of the radicals (for example, signs of square roots) is a primitive th root of unity. This was already shown by Gauss in 1797. Efficient algorithms exist for calculating such expressions.

Cyclic groups
The th roots of unity form under multiplication a cyclic group of order , and in fact these groups comprise all of the finite subgroups of the multiplicative group of the complex number field.  A generator for this cyclic group is a primitive th root of unity.

The th roots of unity form an irreducible representation of any cyclic group of order . The orthogonality relationship also follows from group-theoretic principles as described in Character group.

The roots of unity appear as entries of the eigenvectors of any circulant matrix; that is, matrices that are invariant under cyclic shifts, a fact that also follows from group representation theory as a variant of Bloch's theorem. In particular, if a circulant Hermitian matrix is considered (for example, a discretized one-dimensional Laplacian with periodic boundaries), the orthogonality property immediately follows from the usual orthogonality of eigenvectors of Hermitian matrices.

Cyclotomic fields

By adjoining a primitive th root of unity to  one obtains the th cyclotomic field This field contains all th roots of unity and is the splitting field of the th cyclotomic polynomial over  The field extension  has degree φ(n) and its Galois group is naturally isomorphic to the multiplicative group of units of the ring 

Every subfield of a cyclotomic field is an abelian extension of the rationals. It follows that every nth root of unity may be expressed in term of k-roots, with various k not exceeding φ(n). In these cases Galois theory can be written out explicitly in terms of Gaussian periods: this theory from the Disquisitiones Arithmeticae of Gauss was published many years before Galois.

Conversely, every abelian extension of the rationals is such a subfield of a cyclotomic field – this is the content of a theorem of Kronecker, usually called the Kronecker–Weber theorem on the grounds that Weber completed the proof.

Relation to quadratic integers

 For  they are Eisenstein integers.
 For  they are Gaussian integers: see Imaginary unit.

For , none of the non-real roots of unity (which satisfy a quartic equation) is a quadratic integer, but the sum  of each root with its complex conjugate (also a 5th root of unity) is an element of the ring Z[]. For two pairs of non-real 5th roots of unity these sums are inverse golden ratio and minus golden ratio.

For , for any root of unity   equals to either 0, ±2, or ±.

For , for any root of unity,   equals to either 0, ±1, ±2 or ±.

See also
 Argand system
 Circle group, the unit complex numbers
 Cyclotomic field
 Group scheme of roots of unity
 Dirichlet character
 Ramanujan's sum
 Witt vector
 Teichmüller character

Notes

References
 
 
 
 
 
 
 

Algebraic numbers
Cyclotomic fields
Polynomials
1 (number)
Complex numbers